The policy of standardization was a policy implemented by the Sri Lankan government in 1971 to curtail the number of Tamil students selected for certain faculties in the universities. In 1972, the government added a district quota as a parameter within each language. In 1977 this policy was annulled and new policies were implemented for a fair education. Now, students from districts with inadequate educational facilities are given an allocated quota irrespective of their race.

The reasoning for the law

Under the British, English was the state language and consequently greatly benefited English speakers. However the majority of Sri Lankan populace lived outside urban areas and did not belong to the social elite, and therefore did not enjoy the benefits of English-medium education. The issue was compounded further by the fact that in Jaffna, where a largely Tamil populace resided, students had access to English-medium education through missionary schools. 

In addition, many Tamils sought jobs in government service and the medical and engineering professions due to the lack of opportunities in the densely populated dry zone of Jaffna, where crop yields were low. As a result Tamil parents pressurised their children to master English, Mathematics and Science as a means to secure good employment, and to avoid a life of unemployment and hard labour. This created a situation where a large proportion of students enrolled in universities throughout the country were English speaking Tamils and Sinhalese from urban centers like Colombo, particularly in professional courses such as medicine and engineering. 

In the early 1970s, some Sinhalese complained of Tamils overrepresentation in universities, especially in engineering and the sciences.

Despite this in 1979, over 21% of the illiterates in the Tamil districts had no schooling, compared to 23% for the country as a whole. The highest rates of literacy were found in the Sinhala wet zone districts such as Matara, Kalutara, Gampaha and Colombo districts. Compared to the national average, the Tamil districts had a lower percentage attending primary and secondary school. Despite only a measly 6.67% of the estate Tamil population having secondary schooling, the government adopted no measures to create special ethnic quotas for them.

The implementation of the law
The government policy of standardisation was in essence a discriminatory regulation to curtail the number of Tamil students selected for certain faculties in the universities. The benefits enjoyed by Sinhalese students as a result of this also meant a significant fall in the number of Tamil students within the Sri Lankan university student populace.

University selection of 1971 was calculated based on language they sit. Numbers of allocations were proportional to the number of participants who sat to the examination in that language. As guaranteed before the exam, Tamil share was dropped to the proportion of the Tamils medium students (According to 1971 census 27% of the total population used Tamil as first medium).

According to 1971 exam results, a large proportion of the Tamil allocation was enjoyed by Tamils in Jaffna and a large proportion of the Sinhalese share was enjoyed by the Sinhalese in Colombo.

In 1972 government added district quota as a parameter within each languages. 30% of university places were allocated on the basis of island-wide merit; half the places were allocated on the basis of comparative scores within districts and an additional 15% reserved for students from under privileged districts.

A lower university entrance qualifying mark for Sinhalese-medium students was also introduced in 1971 for science faculties, as shown by the table below:

The effect of the law

The hardest hit population group were the Sri Lankan Tamils, rather than the affluent Sinhalese of the rural and urban areas. Sinhalese historian C.R. de Silva stated that "ethnically there is little doubt that the major blow fell on Ceylon Tamils."

In 1969, the Northern Province, which was largely populated by Tamils and comprised 7% of the population of the country, provided 27.5 percent of the entrants to science-based courses in Sri Lankan universities. By 1974, this was reduced to 7%. However, Tamils were underrepresented in university as a whole in 1970, constituting 21.6% of the population, but holding only 16% of the places.

The Indian Tamils had not gained from standardisation, despite having "the poorest schooling facilities on the island".

Ratnajeevan Hoole in a letter to the Washington Times recounts:

In 1969, the Western Province provided 67.5 percent of admissions to science-based courses. This reduced to 27% in 1974, after a further law came into effect in 1973. 

In 1971, a system of standardisation of marks was introduced for admissions to the universities, obviously directed against Tamil-medium students. K. M. de Silva describes it as follows:

He observes that by doing this in such an obviously discriminatory way, 'the United Front Government of the 1970s caused enormous harm to ethnic relations.'

This was not the end; in 1972 the 'district quota system' was introduced, again to the detriment of the Sri Lankan Tamil people. The Sinhalese historian C.R. de Silva wrote:

Singapore's founding Prime minister Lee Kuan Yew, one of Asia's most respected statesman summarized the negative effect of the policy:

Changing the standardization 

The language based standardization of university entrance was abandoned in 1977, and introduced different standardization based on merits, district quotas. 80% of the university places were filled in accordance with raw marks scored by students. The remaining 20% of places was allocated to students in districts with inadequate educational facilities.

See also
 Education in Sri Lanka
 Sri Lankan universities
 Sri Lankan Civil War

References

External links
Ministry of Higher Education Sri Lanka
Undergraduate statistics 2000-2007

Politics of Sri Lanka
Education policy in Sri Lanka
Sri Lankan Tamil history
Political repression
Origins of the Sri Lankan Civil War
Affirmative action in Asia
Education policy
Quotas